Frederick Hobbs may refer to:
Fred Hobbs (1841–1920), mayor of Christchurch, New Zealand
Fred R. Hobbs (1947–2919), American businessman politician, member of the Tennessee House of Representatives
Frederick Hobbs (Pennsylvania politician) (1934–2005), American politician, member of the Pennsylvania State Senate
Frederick Hobbs (singer) (1874–1942), New Zealand-born singer, actor and theatre manager